The Danube Promenade is located on the Pest side of Budapest, Hungary. The promenade itself lies on the left bank of the Danube, extending from the Széchenyi Chain Bridge to the Erzsébet Bridge.

History 
From the middle of the 19th century the city center has developed rather fast. On the left bank of the Danube a row of hotels began to rise. These were the Hungária, Bristol (Duna Szálló), Carlton, and Ritz (Duna palota). Among them only Bristol  survived the destruction of World War II, but in 1969 the hotel was demolished. In front of the hotels an esplanade took shape that later became known as Dunakorzó (En:  Danube Boardwalk).

Along the esplanade 
The southern end of the promenade is the Március 15 Square, where the remains of a Roman bastion, Contra-Aquincum, are displayed, The Inner City Parish Church’s simple exterior conceals a colorful past: it was built as a Romanesque basilica and later was used as a mosque during the Turkish occupation and was finally reconceived in the baroque style in the 18th century.

The center of the promenade is the Vigadó Square with the famous Vigadó Concert Hall.

At the other end of the street can be found Gresham-palota and the Hungarian Academy of Sciences .

Important buildings and landmarks around the promenade 

Contra-Aquincum, a 4th century Roman fortress next to Erzsébet Bridge
Inner City Parish Church
Vigadó Concert Hall
Gresham-palota
Hungarian Academy of Sciences next to Széchenyi Chain Bridge

Sculptures 

István Széchenyi - near to the Hungarian Academy of Sciences
József Eötvös -  1879 sculptor Huszár Adolf 
Hungarian Seaman Memorial - the anchor of "Ungvár" (copy) - Szende Pál utca 
József Nádor Archduke Joseph, Palatine of Hungary
Little Princess - near to Vigadó Concert Hall - Also in Marton László sculptors garden Naphegy Tigris utca, with other works.
Attila József - famous poet of "At the Danube" also by László Marton (sculptor) at Hungarian Parliament Building
Mihály Vörösmarty
William Shakespeare
Petőfi Sándor
Shoes on the Danube Promenade Gyula Pauer and Can Togay - April 16. 2005.

Gallery

See also 
Naphegy
Shoes on the Danube Promenade
Tabán
World Heritage Site

Sources 
Budapest Info 
www.visitbudapest.travel
www.welovebudapest.com

References

External links 
Google search "Danube Promenade"
Google search "Dunakorzó" (Hungarian name)
Walking Tour 1: Pest's Inner City

Maps 
Google Map from Széchenyi Chain Bridge to Erzsébet Bridge
Near view to Vigadó Tér and Vörösmarty tér on Google Map 
Danube Promenade on the old Map from 1905. 
1905, the last years of Austria-Hungary.

Geography of Budapest
Tourist attractions in Budapest
History of Budapest
World Heritage Sites in Hungary
Waterfronts
Danube